"Sweet Sweet Poison" is a song recorded by Canadian country music artist Jim Witter. It was released in 1994 as the fourth single from his debut album, Jim Witter. It peaked at number 6 on the RPM Country Tracks chart in June 1994.

Chart performance

Year-end charts

References

1993 songs
1994 singles
Jim Witter songs
Songs written by Jim Witter
FRE Records singles